Laval Agglomération is the communauté d'agglomération, an intercommunal structure, centred on the city of Laval. It is located in the Mayenne department, in the Pays de la Loire region, western France. It was created in 2001 as the Communauté d'agglomération de Laval. It was merged with the former communauté de communes du Pays de Loiron to form the communauté d'agglomération Laval Agglomération on 1 January 2019. Its area is 686.1 km2. Its population was 113,854 in 2016, of which 49,573 in Laval proper.

Composition
The communauté d'agglomération consists of the following 34 communes:

Ahuillé
Argentré
Beaulieu-sur-Oudon
Bonchamp-lès-Laval
Le Bourgneuf-la-Forêt
Bourgon
La Brûlatte
Châlons-du-Maine
Changé
La Chapelle-Anthenaise
Entrammes
Forcé
Le Genest-Saint-Isle
La Gravelle
L'Huisserie
Launay-Villiers
Laval
Loiron-Ruillé
Louverné
Louvigné
Montflours
Montigné-le-Brillant
Montjean
Nuillé-sur-Vicoin
Olivet
Parné-sur-Roc
Port-Brillet
Saint-Berthevin
Saint-Cyr-le-Gravelais
Saint-Germain-le-Fouilloux
Saint-Jean-sur-Mayenne
Saint-Ouën-des-Toits
Saint-Pierre-la-Cour
Soulgé-sur-Ouette

See also
 Agglomeration communities in France

References

Agglomeration communities in France
Intercommunalities of Mayenne